Mary Somerset may refer to:

St Mary Somerset, a church in the City of London
Lady Mary Somerset of Worcester (born c. 1515), Baroness Grey de Wilton
Mary FitzRoy, Duchess of Richmond and Somerset (1519–1557), daughter-in-law of King Henry VIII of England
Mary Somerset, Duchess of Beaufort (gardener) (1630-1715), who introduced a number of exotic plants to British gardens
Mary Somerset, Duchess of Beaufort (sportswoman) (1897-1987), a relative of the British royal family